Zsombor Senkó (born 4 January 2003) is a Hungarian professional footballer who plays as a goalkeeper for Nemzeti Bajnokság II club Diósgyőri VTK.

Club career

Juventus
Senkó made his Serie C debut for Juventus U23 – the reserve team of Juventus – on 17 January 2021, playing as a starter in a 1–1 home draw against Piacenza. On 27 February, Senkó extended his contract with Juventus until 2022.

Senkó was first called up to the first team on 6 January 2022, for the Serie A match against Napoli. During the 2021–22 season, Senkó made 29 appearances and helped the U19s reach the UEFA Youth League semifinals, their best-ever placing in the competition, having also won a penalty shoot-out against Jong AZ in the round of 16. Throughout the season, he never appeared for Juventus U23.

Diósgyőri VTK
On 3 January 2023, he left Juventus to join Nemzeti Bajnokság II club Diósgyőri VTK.

Career statistics

Club

References

Notelist

External links 

 
 

2003 births
Living people
Hungarian footballers
Association football goalkeepers
Zalaegerszegi TE players
Szombathelyi Haladás footballers
Hungarian expatriate footballers
Expatriate footballers in Italy
Hungarian expatriate sportspeople in Italy
Juventus F.C. players
Juventus Next Gen players
Diósgyőri VTK players
Serie C players
Nemzeti Bajnokság II players
Hungary youth international footballers